Como Duele may refer to:

"Como Duele" (Ricardo Arjona song), 2008 song
"Como Duele", 1998 song by Manny Manuel
"Como Duele", 1999 song by Victor Manuelle from the album Inconfundible
"Como Duele", 2001 song by Luis Miguel from the album Mis Romances
"Como Duele", 2005 song by Noelia for the telenovela Barrera de amor